The Eugene Blues were a minor league baseball club based in Eugene, Oregon. In 1904, the Blues played as members of the short–lived Class D level Oregon State League. The 1904 team ended the shortened season in 2nd place and were succeeded decades later in Eugene by the 1950 Eugene Larks of the Far West League.

History
Eugene began minor league play in 1904, when Oregon State League was formed for the 1904 season as a Class D level minor league. The Oregon State League began play as a four–team league, with the league hosting franchises from Roseburg, Oregon (Roseburg Shamrocks), Salem, Oregon (Salem Raglans) and Vancouver, Washington (Vancouver Soldiers) in addition to Eugene.

The league began play in controversy due to the Vancouver franchise. On May 18, 1904, the Vancouver Soldiers, with a 3–8 record, moved from Vancouver, Washington to Albany, Oregon to become the Albany Rollers. This was because Oregon State League was not going to be admitted to the National Association until it vacated the Vancouver, Washington franchise, which was deemed to be in the territory of the Portland Browns franchise of the Pacific Coast League.

Eugene began the season with a 22–19 record, playing under managers Terry McKune and Frank DuShane. On July 6, 1904, the Eugene Blues franchise folded, with the Roseburg Shamrocks folding at the same time. Reduced to two teams, the Oregon State League immediately stopped play on that date. The Oregon State League never returned to minor league play.

The Eugene Blues ended the 1904 season in 2nd place, finishing 5.5 games behind the 1st place Salem Raglands in the final standings.

In 1950, the Eugene Larks were the next minor league team hosted in Eugene, Oregon, playing as members of the Far West League.

The ballpark
The 1904 Blues were noted to have played at "The Palms."

Season-by-season

Notable alumni
Heinie Reitz (1904)

See also
Eugene Blues players

References

External links
Baseball Reference

Professional baseball teams in Oregon
Defunct baseball teams in Oregon
Sports in Eugene, Oregon
Oregon State League teams
Baseball teams established in 1904
Baseball teams disestablished in 1904